Dancing with Demons is a boxing drama novel written by Indian filmmaker and screenwriter Nidhie Sharma and published in 2014. The book is India's first boxing fiction novel and revolves around two fallen souls who need to defeat their inner demons to become the people they were destined to be.

Plot 
Sometimes it takes a single moment to destroy it all. For twenty four year old boxer Karan Pratap Singh, who is on the brink of winning the Heavy weight Boxing Championship, that moment arrives during the last round of the Boxing finals, when he nearly bludgeons his opponent to death in an uncontrolled fit of rage. In that fateful moment, he loses everything he's worked for and is banned from boxing for four years. The four best years of his sporting career, along with his coach and mentor Jerry Fernandez, are lost forever to a rage that he cannot explain. His fall from glory seems fueled by ruthless arrogance and an anger management problem. That, however, is simply symptomatic of a deeper issue. Buried under layers of his fractured subconscious lies a childhood secret, a demon he needs to vanquish, but cannot come to terms with. Karan must vanquish these demons to become the boxer he was meant to be. He must atone and do what it takes to get back into the ring.

Parallelly we meet Sonia Kapoor, a beautiful and volatile young woman with a dark secret that torments her at night but a secret that she seemingly feels no guilt for. Sonia comes to Mumbai on a stormy night with the hope that she, along with her secret, will disappear in the bustling megalopolis. She hopes that Mumbai will hide her and never judge her. But just as a leopard cannot change its spots, nor can the volatile Sonia. And soon, her past catches up with her.

When fate throws Karan and Sonia together in Mumbai, their inner demons and pasts collide and stir up trouble in their fragile and uncertain present. Is it possible to outrun one's past? And is redemption really possible without forgiveness?

Book launch and film adaptation 
The boxing redemption saga will be adapted into a Hindi film. Dancing with Demons was launched and the film announced on 18 November 2014, in an event held in Mumbai which was attended by Bollywood actor Arunoday Singh and filmmaker Sudhir Mishra.

Critical reception 
The book is critically acclaimed by several Indian authors. News 18 described the book as "it's promising and keeps you entertained throughout."
Writing in Deccan Chronicle Anjana Basu states, "a first for its boxing background and for its romantic pair who are so at odds that it seems unlikely that they will ever manage to get together and find true love in a world of lies." She further adds "Strongly visual and action packed, it’s hardly surprising that the author plans to make it into a film."

References 

2014 Indian novels
Indian novels adapted into films
Novels set in India
Novels about boxing
Indian boxing films
Harlequin books